Giuseppe Lo Schiavo also known as GLOS is an Italian-born visual artist based in London. His most recent artistic research is aiming to create a bridge between art and science using digital art, photography, AI and machine learning, virtual reality, infrared systems or even microorganisms.

Biography
Giuseppe Lo Schiavo was born in Vibo Valentia, in the south of Italy. 
He has studied architecture at the Sapienza University of Rome and he is specialized in Architectural 3D Visualization.

Giuseppe Lo Schiavo has been announced as the winner of the European project BioArt Challenge organised by the Museum of Science MUSE. The artist will start research on art and synthetic biology with the support of Cardiff University, Zurich University of Applied Science, the University of Trento and the Museum of Science MUSE.

Giuseppe Lo Schiavo was the first artist to be invited for an artist in residence program in the microbiology lab of University College London UCL in London.

Glos started his career as an artist in 2011 with his series Levitation that was published and exhibited internationally. His recent artistic research focuses on exploring human civilization, sociology and biology.

He currently lives and works between Milan and London.

Awards and exhibitions

In 2021 Lo Schiavo is the winner of the European project BioArt Challenge organised by the Museum of Science MUSE.

In 2020 Lo Schiavo was offered a one-year artist residence program at the university UCL in London in the Microbiology lab of the medical school.

In 2019 Lo Schiavo was a tutor of History of Art at the Marangoni Institute in London that is part of Manchester Metropolitan University.

In June 2015, Giuseppe Lo Schiavo was one of the youngest artists of the group exhibition Il blu nell'arte, da Yves Klein a Jan Fabre. presented at MACA museum in Acri, Cosenza where is work "narcissus" was exhibited together with artists such as Lucio Fontana, Yves Klein, Jan Fabre, Victor Vasarely, Mimmo Rotella, Mimmo Rotella, Raymond Hains, curated by Francesco Poli

In April 2014 Lo Schiavo's gif 'Anamorphic Triangle' was presented at Saatchi Gallery in occasion of the Saatchi Gallery and Google Plus Motion Photography Prize

Lo Schiavo's works were selected for the Portrait Salon 2013 that was presented in the UK and was featured on the BBC.

In November 2013 he won the jury award  on the Bonato Minella Awards in Turin , Italy.  The award was conferred to Lo Schiavo by Vittorio Sgarbi.

The works of Lo Schiavo have been featured in international magazine, radio  and presented in various exhibitions of museums and art galleries in all over the world such as Saatchi Gallery in London, Aperture Foundation in  New York, Museo Arte Contemporanea Acri in Cosenza, in Istanbul  and in other galleries in Rome, Turin and Munich.

References

Living people
1986 births
21st-century Italian photographers
People from Calabria
People from the Province of Vibo Valentia
21st-century male artists